Floyd Daniel Ramsey (1902 – February 22, 1957) was a college football player and later executive with the Columbian Rope Company, residing in Auburn, New York. He was a halfback for the Cornell Big Red beside Eddie Kaw on the undefeated football teams of 1921, 1922 and 1923.

References

1902 births
1957 deaths
American football halfbacks
Cornell Big Red football players
Sportspeople from Auburn, New York